Richard Philippe Dutruel (born 24 December 1972) is a French retired professional footballer who played as a goalkeeper.

Club career
Dutruel was born in Thonon-les-Bains, Haute-Savoie. During his career he represented Paris Saint-Germain FC, Stade Malherbe Caen, RC Celta de Vigo (his most successful period, also appearing in the UEFA Cup), FC Barcelona – during his two seasons he played backup to youngster Pepe Reina in his first year, only being third-choice afterwards– Deportivo Alavés and RC Strasbourg, retiring in June 2005 at nearly 33.

International career
Dutruel won his sole cap for France on 4 October 2000, coming on as a substitute in a 1–1 friendly match against Cameroon.

References

External links

Strasbourg archives 

 

1972 births
Living people
People from Thonon-les-Bains
Sportspeople from Haute-Savoie
French footballers
Association football goalkeepers
Ligue 1 players
Paris Saint-Germain F.C. players
Stade Malherbe Caen players
RC Strasbourg Alsace players
La Liga players
RC Celta de Vigo players
FC Barcelona players
Deportivo Alavés players
France under-21 international footballers
France international footballers
Competitors at the 1993 Mediterranean Games
Mediterranean Games medalists in football
Mediterranean Games bronze medalists for France
French expatriate footballers
Expatriate footballers in Spain
French expatriate sportspeople in Spain
Footballers from Auvergne-Rhône-Alpes